Franklin Edward Harris, known professionally as Kpanto (previously Skinnyboi Kpanto), is a Liberian rapper, songwriter, and record producer. He started his music career in 2014 and gained recognition in 2015 after releasing a cover  of Desiigner's single "Panda". His debut studio album, titled Sound from the Xtreetz, was supported by the singles "Dey Say" and "Community Thing". It won Album of the Year at the 2021 Liberia Music Awards. Kpanto released his second studio album, Son of the Soil, in 2022.

Career
Kpanto, who previously went by the stage name Skinnyboi Kpanto, released his debut single "Dope Boy" in 2014. He gained recognition after releasing a cover of Desiigner's 2015 single "Panda". He was previously signed to Holy Records. 

In 2018, Kpanto was featured on "Bring our Containers Back", a protest song produced and released by AFo4Doe. Recorded entirely in Liberian Kolokwa English, the song addresses Liberia's bank notes that went missing in a shipping container. Bettie Johnson-Mbayo of FrontPage Africa said the singers recorded the song to put an "emphasis on the authority bringing the containers back".

In September 2020, the Music Union of Liberia banned Kpanto's music due to explicit lyrics. Prior to making the announcement, the organization held several meetings to discuss whether his music was suitable for airplay. After the organization's president made the announcement, several artists in the Liberian music industry showed Kpanto support and said they had his back.

Kpanto released his debut studio album, Sound from the Xtreetz, on May 16, 2021. It comprises 16 tracks and features guest appearances from Takun J, PCK, Badman H, Paradise Queen, Primeboy, AFo4doe, Revelation, and Mandingo Priest. The album won Album of the Year at the 2021 Liberia Music Awards. The PCK-assisted track "Dey Say" was released on March 24, 2021, as the album's lead single. The song was produced by Kpanto and has been described as a "party and street banger". It won Collaboration of the Year and was nominated for Song of the Year and Afropop Song of the Year at the 2021 Liberia Music Awards. The album's second single "Community Thing" was released on May 9, 2021, and features vocals by Badman H. The song won Hipco/Trapco Song of the Year and was nominated for Collaboration of the Year at the 2021 Liberia Music Awards.

In May 2022, Kpanto performed at four musical concerts held across Nimba, Margibi, Grand Bassa, and Montserrado counties. The concerts commemorated the fifth anniversary of Orange S.A.'s arrival in Liberia, and featured additional performances from MC Caro, Stunna, and Kobazzie, among others. Kpanto's second studio album, titled Son of the Soil, was released on May 14, 2022. The album comprises 16 tracks and garnered over 390,000 streams on Audiomack as of August 2022.

Discography

Studio albums
Sound from the Xtreetz (2021)
Son of the Soil (2022)

Awards and nominations

See also
List of Liberian musicians

References

Living people
Liberian male musicians
Liberian songwriters